Lili Boniche (Élie Boniche, April 29, 1922 – March 6, 2008) was an Algerian singer of Andalusian-Arab music. Boniche was the heir to an erudite, centuries-long tradition of Algerian song and a pillar of Franco-Arab music. 

Born into a Sephardic Jewish family in the Casbah area of Algiers, Boniche was a child prodigy who taught himself to play his father's mandola at the age of seven. Later as an in-demand singer throughout France in the 1940s and during wartime. Boniche incorporated the tango, paso doble and mambo into his repertoire, especially while entertaining the troops. He is known for having sung with Arabic lyrics a number of great Cuban popular songs as part of his regular repertoire. He retired in the 1950s, only to launch a second career in 1990, releasing the album Boniche Dub in 1998, produced by Bill Laswell and fashion doyen Jean Touitou. The album earned him new fans across Europe. This retrospective combining his greatest hits and previously unreleased works not only fills a gap with regard to available recordings, but it pays tribute to an important pioneer of cultural fusion.

In addition to writing music for commercial release, he also was a film composer.. He died in Paris.

Discography 
 Alger, Alger , Roir Records/E1, February 16, 1999
Œuvres récentes , APC  Play it Again Sam, 2003
Il n'y a qu'un seul Dieu (live à l'Olympia), East West Warner Music France, 1999
Trésors de la chanson judéo-arabe, Créon Mélodie

References

External links 
Biography at Oriente.de
Biography @ Uncommon Sound
Discography @ Afrik.com 
 

1922 births
2008 deaths
Algerian Jews
Algerian musicians
People from Algiers
French Sephardi Jews
French people of Algerian-Jewish descent
Migrants from French Algeria to France